Mark Warford, is an American author, director, producer, composer, photographer, environmentalist, and human rights advocate.

Career

Highly acclaimed for his worldview creative work, Warford is a CLIO Award-winning director, producer, environmentalist, and author. Warford has also directed creative and strategic operations for the likes of Agence France-Presse (AFP), Getty Images, Greenpeace and 'We Are The World 2'.

Warford has written with, directed and produced notable international artists such as Eurythmics co-founder David A. Stewart, platinum-selling British soul singer Joss Stone, and also the Dalai Lama and Harry Belafonte.

Warford teamed with Sir Anthony Hopkins to produce the CLIO Award-winning spot, ACT. Written and directed by Warford, the 60-second spot deals with the plight of whales being hunted for scientific purposes.

Spaceman Spiritus  was published, March 2022. The novel is a sensitive, time-condensing, science-fiction story set concurrently on Earth and within an unidentified galaxy. The narrative is based upon the exploits of Spiritus, Shepard, Peel, and two stray labradors, Martha and Pup. United by their instinctual journeys, each struggles with a unique perception of the melancholy associated with the long journey home.

Supermassive Superstar  was published, April 2020. Set primarily in London, New York and the southwest USA in 1978, the novel is a rock ’n roll allegory fueled by an emotive, time-traveling mystery. Set against the turbulent issues of the time, the story introduces wayward musician, Beecher Stowe, and his band. United in their desire for fame and fortune, they fall under the spell of a reclusive and ageless muse. With her sun-bleached hair and her sun-shaded eyes and her Bardot lips, she journeys in the service of a man for whom the ravages of time hold no regard; a man that has wandered the earth, stranded in a parallel dimension for centuries. 

The debut novel of a continuing series, Sky Blue Sky  was published, February 2016. The action/adventure series introduces the protagonist, anti-hero Thomas Edward Muir, and is told in a lean, hard, athletic narrative prose that uniquely bridges the void between general fiction and conventional literary works.

The sequel to Sky Blue Sky   in the continuing series, Says Who?  was published January 2018.

On March 1, 2015, the original script (including song lyrics) for the international cross-media project, A Voyage For Soldier Miles  was published by Cry Desert Music Publishing, Inc.

Beginning in 2011, Warford began production on the dramatized audio production, 'A Voyage For Soldier Miles'. Renowned Swedish artist, Leif e. Boman is also credited as a contributor to the soundtrack.

In 2008 Warford was elected as a 100 Places Global Climate Ambassador, joining Archbishop Desmond Tutu, Australian Minister for Environment Protection, Heritage and the Arts Peter Garrett, Rajendra Kumar Pachauri chair of the Intergovernmental Panel on Climate Change (IPCC) and Danish Actress Connie Inge-Lise Nielsen.

From 2004 to 2006, Warford steered the creative direction and production of Project Thin Ice, a multi-year, multi-national initiative to address the mounting impact of climate change. Warford led the strategic operations and media coverage for two successive attempts by explorers Lonnie Dupre and Eric Larsen to cross the Arctic Ocean in summer. The event was successfully completed in July 2006.

From 2003 to 2012, Warford acted as chair of the Board of Crude Accountability, a Washington DC-based non-profit working primarily in the Caspian Sea basin to protect the region's natural environment and to ensure environmental justice for communities impacted by natural resource development.

From 2000 to 2007, Warford directed media teams covering global news issues in Kazakhstan, Russia, Mexico, USA, Ecuador, Malaysia, Philippines, and Canada, amongst other locations. As a photographer, Warford has been published in all of the world’s major news journals, including The New York Times, The Washington Post, Sydney Morning Herald, The Guardian, The Times, National Geographic and the South China Morning Post. In 2005, Warford was announced as a member of Greenpeace International's Program Council.

In 1998, Warford accepted the role of managing editor for Getty Images.

References

1962 births
Living people
21st-century American novelists
American male novelists
American photojournalists
American film directors
American environmentalists
American male writers
American cinematographers
American documentary film directors
American people of English descent
American male guitarists
American rock guitarists
American male singer-songwriters
American record producers
American singer-songwriters
21st-century American male writers